Noel Milleskog (born 8 May 2002) is a Swedish football forward who plays for Örebro SK.

Örebro refused a bid from IFK Norrköping during the winter of 2023, encompassing  to 1.5 million.

References

2002 births
Living people
Swedish footballers
Association football forwards
Örebro SK players
Karlslunds IF players
Allsvenskan players
Superettan players